Let's Not Meet: A True Horror Podcast is a true horror podcast hosted by Andrew Tate and produced by Cryptic County. Each episode consists of Andrew Tate narrating a number of true short stories.

Background 
Tate prefers using as few sound effects and music as possible and instead focus on the storytelling. Tate reads roughly six stories in each episode, which are about one hour in length. The show tells true horror stories written by people who have experienced unwanted encounters. The show has released over 150 episodes over the course of eight seasons.

Reception 
The show was a finalist in the 2019 Discover Pods awards. Podcast Magazine ranked the show as number twenty-five on their list of the best horror and crime podcasts. Anthony D. Herrera of The A.V. Club commented on the show saying that "there is some variation in the quality of the writing ... [but] the authenticity always shines through." Madeline Wahl of Reader's Digest praised the show saying that the listener will "be hooked (and a little jumpy) after listening to just one episode." Emily Stein of CrimeReads praised the show's host saying that "Tate does an excellent job of convincingly taking on the voice of each writer." Nicky Idika of PopBuzz commented on the show saying that the show "will have you thinking carefully about every interaction you have from now on."  Kayla Osborne of The Camden-Narellan Advertiser commented on the show saying that the "podcast is the equivalent of the hair on the back of your neck standing up."

See also 

 List of horror podcasts

References

External links 

 
 

2019 podcast debuts
Audio podcasts
Horror podcasts
Crime podcasts
Patreon creators
Monologue podcasts